The Sarah Lowe Stedman House is a private house located at 632 Grand Street in Allegan, Michigan. It was added to the National Register of Historic Places in 1987.

History
The Sarah Lowe Stedman House is located on a tract of land first purchased by James Lowe in 1834. In 1857, Sarah Lowe Stedman constructed this house on the property. In 1898, local attorney and circuit court judge Philip Padgham purchased the house and enlarged it.

Description
The Sarah Lowe Stedman House is a two-story L-shaped brick Italianate house on a masonry foundation. It has a low-pitched hipped roof and tall windows with segmental-arch window caps. It has a pair of entry porches and bay windows on two sides. The ell portion was added in 1898.

References

National Register of Historic Places in Allegan County, Michigan
Italianate architecture in Michigan
Houses completed in 1875